Seth MacFarlane is an American actor, animator, writer, producer, director, comedian, and singer. MacFarlane began his career as an animator and writer for Hanna-Barbera for several television series, including Johnny Bravo, Cow and Chicken, Dexter's Laboratory, and created a sequel to his college thesis film Larry & Steve.

Since 1999, MacFarlane has served as creator, writer, executive producer, and lead voice actor in the adult animated sitcom Family Guy on FOX. He voices the characters of Peter Griffin, Stewie Griffin, Brian Griffin and among other characters. The series has garnered critical acclaim with critics and audiences and has won numerous awards. Since then MacFarlane has co-created, co-writes, executive produces, and lead voices in FOX's American Dad! and wrote, co-created, executive produced, and had a supporting voice role in The Cleveland Show, which was a spin-off of Family Guy. In 2012, MacFarlane made his feature film directorial debut for Universal Pictures with Ted, a fantasy comedy which was well received by critics and audiences. He went on to act, write, produce, and direct two more features for Universal—the western comedy A Million Ways to Die in the West (2014) and a sequel to his first film Ted 2 (2015). In 2017, MacFarlane created his fourth show, The Orville. He has also appeared in the films Hellboy II: The Golden Army (2008), Futurama: Into the Wild Green Yonder (2009), The Drawn Together Movie: The Movie! (2010), Tooth Fairy (2010), Movie 43 (2013), Sing (2016), and Logan Lucky (2017).

MacFarlane has received numerous awards and nominations for his work on film, television, music, and video games. He has also received twenty-three Emmy Award nominations, winning five for Family Guy. His directorial film debut in Ted earned him an Academy Award nomination for Best Original Song. In addition, he has received five Grammy Award nominations and two British Academy of Film and Television Arts among others.

Film

As executive producer only

Television

As executive producer only

Video games

Web

See also
 List of awards and nominations received by Seth MacFarlane

References

External links
 

Director filmographies
Male actor filmographies
American filmographies